Hot Rock & Alternative Songs (formerly known as Rock Songs and Hot Rock Songs) is a record chart published by Billboard magazine. From its debut on June 20, 2009, through October 13, 2012, the chart ranked the airplay of songs across alternative, mainstream rock, and triple A radio stations in the United States. Beginning with the chart dated October 20, 2012, the chart has followed the methodology of the Billboard Hot 100 by incorporating digital download sales, streaming data, and radio airplay of rock songs over all formats. From that time until mid-2020, only the performance of core rock songs, including those with an "alternative bent", were tabulated and ranked for the chart. With the chart dated June 13, 2020, Billboard revamped the chart to permit a broader selection of songs considered alternative "hybrids" with other genres and renamed it to Hot Rock & Alternative Songs.

Number ones

The first number-one track on the chart was Green Day's "Know Your Enemy". Since its introduction, 63 songs have reached the number-one position on chart. Imagine Dragons have had the most with five, combining for a total of 104 weeks at the summit. Panic! at the Disco's "High Hopes" spent a record 65 non-consecutive weeks atop the chart, and along with their song "Hey Look Ma, I Made It", the band claimed the number-one spot on the chart for the entirety of 2019.

Statistics

By artist

Songs by total number of weeks at number one

References

Notes

Footnotes

External links
Billboard website

Billboard charts
Rock music mass media